Leena Nair (née Menon;born 1969) is an Indian business executive who is the Global CEO of Chanel. Nair previously served as the Chief Human Resource Officer of Unilever and member of the Unilever Leadership Executive. Nair was responsible for the human capital of Unilever, which operates across multiple regulatory and labour environments spread over 190 countries. Under her leadership, Unilever has been named the number one FMCG graduate employer of choice in 54 countries. She headed the Diversity and Inclusion agenda for the organisation ensuring that its workforce is diverse and inclusive. Nair is an advocate for human-centred workplaces and compassionate leadership.

Early life and education
Nair grew up in Kolhapur, Maharashtra. She studied at Holy Cross Convent High School Kohlapur, and The New College Kolhapur. After completing her bachelor's degree in electronics and telecommunication (E&TC) Engineering at Walchand College of Engineering, Sangli (Maharashtra), she graduated from XLRI – Xavier School of Management as a gold medallist (1990-1992). Apart from working in Jamshedpur, she also worked at three different factories in Kolkata, Ambattur, Tamil Nadu and Taloja, Maharashtra.

Career

Chanel 
In 2016, Nair became Unilever's "first female, first Asian, youngest ever" chief human-resources officer.  In December 2021, Nair was appointed chief executive officer of Chanel.  She is the mentee of Indra Nooyi, former CEO of PepsiCo.

Unilever
2016: Appointed Chief Human Resources Officer and member of the Unilever Leadership Executive
2013: SVP HR Leadership and Organizational Development and Global Head of Diversity 
2007: Executive Director HR of Hindustan Unilever Limited
1992-2007: Various roles in factories, sales and corporate headquarters in Hindustan Unilever
1992: Joined Unilever as management trainee of Hindustan Unilever

Other responsibilities
 Non-Executive Board Member – BT plc
 Member of the Trust Board - Leverhulme Trust 
 Steering Committee member – The Future of Education, Gender and Work, WEF (2017–present)
 Leadership Council Member – International Centre for Research on Women (2019 – present)
 NED on the UK Government's department of Business, Energy and Industrial strategy (BEIS) (2018- 2020)

Awards and recognition
 Forbes India's Top Self-Made Women's List (aka W-Power) (2022)
 Role Model of Year, The Great British Businesswoman's Awards (2021)
 Fortune India's Most Powerful Women's List (2021)
Global Indian of the Year – The Economic Times’ Prime Women Leadership Awards (2020)
 LinkedIn Top Voice (2018-2020)
 Thinkers50 List  – Thinkers Who Will Shape the Future of Business (2019)
 Top 10 list of FT HERoes Champions of Women in Business by the Financial Times (2017-2019)
 Recognized by Queen Elizabeth II as one of the accomplished Indian Business Leaders in the UK (2017)

Personal life 
Nair is the daughter of K. Karthikeyan, and the cousin of industrialists Vijay Menon and Sachin Menon.  She is married and has two sons. Her interests include reading, running, and Bollywood dancing.

References

1969 births
Living people
Businesswomen from Maharashtra
People from Kolhapur
Indian women chief executives
Businesspeople from Maharashtra
Indian chief executives
Unilever people
21st-century Indian businesswomen
21st-century Indian businesspeople
XLRI – Xavier School of Management alumni